The High Sheriff of Devon is the Kings's representative for the County of Devon, a territory known as his/her bailiwick. Selected from three nominated people, they hold the office for one year. They have judicial, ceremonial and administrative functions and execute High Court Writs. The title was historically "Sheriff of Devon", but changed in 1974 to "High Sheriff of Devon".

History
The office of Sheriff is the oldest under the Crown. It is over 1000 years old; it was established before the Norman Conquest. It remained first in precedence in the counties, until the reign of Edward VII, when an Order in Council in 1908 gave the Lord-Lieutenant the prime office under the Crown as the Sovereign's personal representative. Under the provisions of the Local Government Act 1972, on 1 April 1974 the office previously known as Sheriff was retitled High Sheriff. The High Sheriff remains the Sovereign's representative in the county for all matters relating to the Judiciary and the maintenance of law and order.

Sheriffs of Devon

Before 1300 
Names indented are those of undersheriffs.

1300–1399

1400–1499

1500–1599

1600–1699

1700–1799

1800–1899

1900–1973

High Sheriffs of Devon

1974–1999

2000–present

References

Bibliography
  (with amendments of 1963, Public Record Office)

External links
 Website of the High Sheriff of Devon

 
History of Devon
Devon
Local government in Devon
Devon-related lists